Geoffrey Palis (born 8 July 1991) is a French rugby union player. His usual position is as a fullback, and he currently plays for Castres Olympique in the Top 14 and the France national team.

International career
In January 2014, Palis was named in the France national team for the 2014 Six Nations Championship.
Palis was called up to the France national team again ahead of France's opening 2018 Six Nations Championship match against Ireland. He started in that game and played the full 80 minutes in an eventual 13–15 home loss.

References

External links
France profile at FFR
ESPN Profile

Sportspeople from Albi
1991 births
Living people
French rugby union players
Castres Olympique players
Rugby union fullbacks
France international rugby union players